Dickinson County is a county in the Upper peninsula of the U.S. state of Michigan. As of the 2020 census, the population was 25,947.  The county seat is Iron Mountain. Dickinson is Michigan's newest county, formed in 1891 from parts of Marquette, Menominee, and Iron counties. It was named for Donald M. Dickinson, who served as U.S. Postmaster General under President Grover Cleveland.

Dickinson County is part of the Iron Mountain, MI–WI Micropolitan Statistical Area.

Geography
Along with Iron County, it is one of only two landlocked counties in the Upper Peninsula.

Major highways

Airport
 KIMT - Ford Airport

Adjacent counties
 Marquette County (north/EST Border)
 Menominee County (southeast)
 Marinette County, Wisconsin (south)
 Florence County, Wisconsin (southwest)
 Iron County (west)

Demographics

The 2010 United States Census indicates Dickinson County had a population of 26,168. This is a decrease of 1,304 people from the 2000 United States Census. This is a -4.7% change in population. In 2010 there were 11,359 households and 7,320 families in the county. The population density was 34.4 per square mile (13.3 square kilometers). There were 13,990 housing units at an average density of 18.4 per square mile (7.1 square kilometers). 97.2% of the population were White, 0.6% Native American, 0.5% Asian,  0.3% Black or African American, 0.2% of some other race and 1.2% of two or more races. 1.0% were Hispanic or Latino (of any race). 17.4% were of German, 13.1% Italian, 11.2% French, French Canadian or Cajun, 11.1% Swedish, 7.4% Polish, 6.9% Irish, 6.9% English and 5.5% Finnish ancestry.

There were 11,359 households, out of which 26.5% had children under the age of 18 living with them, 51.0% were husband and wife families, 9.0% had a female householder with no husband present, 35.6% were non-families, and 30.6% were made up of individuals. The average household size was 2.26 and the average family size was 2.80.

In the county, the population was spread out, with 21.4% under age of 18, 6.7% from 18 to 24, 21.3% from 25 to 44, 31.6% from 45 to 64, and 19.0% who were 65 years of age or older. The median age was 45 years. 49.2% of the population was male, and 50.8% was female.

The 2010 American Community Survey 3-year estimate indicates the median income for a household in the county was $42,331 and the median income for a family was $52,222. Males had a median income of $31,402 versus $14,957 for females. The per capita income for the county was $22,583. About 3.4% of families and 10.9% of the population were below the poverty line, including 11.4% of those under the age 18 and 11.3% of those age 65 or over.

Government 

The county government operates the jail, maintains rural roads, operates the major local courts,
keeps files of deeds and mortgages, maintains vital records, administers public health regulations, and
participates with the state in the provision of welfare and other social services. The county
board of commissioners controls the budget but has only limited authority to make laws or ordinances.  In
Michigan, most local government functions — police and fire, building and zoning, tax assessment, street
maintenance, etc. — are the responsibility of individual cities and townships.  In the 2006 elections, it was also the most supportive county of proposal 2, a state constitutional amendment banning affirmative action programs.  It received 74.2% support in the county.

The county was a bellwether in every presidential election from 1920 to 2004 (with exception to 1968).

Elected officials
 Prosecuting Attorney: Lisa Richards
 Sheriff: Scott Rutter
 County Clerk: Dolly Cook
 Register of Deeds: Dolly Cook

 County Treasurer: Lorna Carey
 Drain Commissioner: Kevin Trevillain
 Mine Inspector: Steven Smith

(information as of July 2013)

Communities

Cities
 Iron Mountain (county seat)
 Kingsford
 Norway

Census-designated place
 Quinnesec

Other unincorporated communities

 Alfred
 Antoine
 Channing
 East Kingsford
 Felch
 Felch Mountain
 Floodwood
 Foster City
 Granite Bluff
 Hardwood
 Hylas
 Loretto
 Merriman
 Metropolitan
 Ralph
 Randville
 Sagola
 Skidmore
 Spruce
 Theodore
 Turner
 Vulcan
 Waucedah

Charter townships
 Breitung Charter Township

Townships
 Breen Township
 Felch Township
 Norway Township
 Sagola Township
 Waucedah Township
 West Branch Township

See also
 List of Michigan State Historic Sites in Dickinson County, Michigan
 National Register of Historic Places listings in Dickinson County, Michigan

References

External links

 Dickinson county government
 Dickinson Area Partnership
 Dickinson County Profile, Sam M Cohodas Regional Economist, Tawni Hunt Ferrarini, Ph.D.
 

 
Michigan counties
1891 establishments in Michigan
Populated places established in 1891